Prof. Dr. Semra Ülkü is a Turkish educator and university administrator who served for eight years (1998–2006) as the rector of the İzmir Institute of Technology. She was the second academic to serve in the institution's top position since its founding in 1992.

Semra Ülkü received her degrees in chemical engineering from Ankara's Middle East Technical University (B.Sc., 1969, M.Sc., 1971 and Ph.D., 1975). Among her research writings, which have been published in a number of scientific journals, have been:

References

External links
 Semra Ülkü, Professor, İYTE Department of Chemical Engineering 

Turkish educators
İzmir Institute of Technology
People from İzmir
Living people
Year of birth missing (living people)
Place of birth missing (living people)
Rectors of İzmir Institute of Technology